Brian Jolly (born 1 March 1946) is a former British cyclist. He competed in the individual road race at the 1968 Summer Olympics.

References

External links
 

1946 births
Living people
British male cyclists
Olympic cyclists of Great Britain
Cyclists at the 1968 Summer Olympics
Sportspeople from Sheffield
20th-century British people